Craanford is a small village in north County Wexford, Ireland, situated on the R725 regional road midway between Gorey and Carnew.

It is closely associated with the Irish Rebellion of 1798. The village features an early 17th-century corn mill which has been restored and a small church. Craanford also has an aqua park at the bottom of the village.  The River Lask also flows through Craanford.

Education
St. Patricks National School is the local primary school.

Sport
The village also has a GAA club and Camogie Club which now has a walking track around the local G.A.A. pitch.
They have an indoor complex and  two new dressing rooms and an underpass from the school.

See also
 List of towns and villages in Ireland

References

External links
 Craanford on NorthWexford.com

Towns and villages in County Wexford